Stella is a 1950 American black comedy film directed by Claude Binyon and starring Ann Sheridan, Victor Mature and Leif Erickson.

Plot
When a relative dies in an accident, family members worry that they will be suspected of murder, so they bury the body, but that does not solve anything.

Cast
 Ann Sheridan as Stella Bevans
 Victor Mature as Jeff DeMarco
 Leif Erickson as Fred Anderson Jr.
 David Wayne as Carl Granger
 Randy Stuart as Claire
 Marion Marshall as Mary
 Frank Fontaine as Don
 Evelyn Varden as Flora
 Lea Penman as Mrs. Calhoun
 Joyce MacKenzie as Peggy Denny
 Hobart Cavanaugh as Tim Gross

Production
The novel Family Skeleton by Doris Miles Disney was published in 1949. The New York Times described the book as "half humorous... not a  mystery, hardly even a murder novel, and certainly not the light farce suggested by the publisher's grinning skull symbol." Hero Jeff di Marco later appeared in Disney's Straw Man in 1951.

The film was known as Stella and the City Man. Susan Hayward was meant to play the title role but refused and was put on suspension. Ann Sheridan replaced her. Filming started in March 1950.

Stella was Hobart Cavanaugh's last film; he knew he did not have long to live and collapsed twice on set, but was determined to see it through.

Critical reception
The New York Times wrote "With a good cast, including David Wayne and Ann Sheridan; dialogue which is generally bright and often quite satirical, Mr. Binyon has put together a surprisingly funny show."

References

External links

1950 films
1950s black comedy films
American black comedy films
Films based on American novels
Films directed by Claude Binyon
Films scored by Cyril J. Mockridge
20th Century Fox films
Films produced by Sol C. Siegel
1950 comedy-drama films
American black-and-white films
1950s English-language films
1950s American films